This is a list of Tamil national-type primary schools (SJK(T)) in Kedah, Malaysia. As of June 2022, there are 60 Tamil primary schools with a total of 7,095 students.

List of Tamil national-type primary schools in Kedah

Baling District

Bandar Baharu District

Kota Setar District

Kuala Muda District

Kubang Pasu District

Kulim District

Langkawi District

Pendang District

Pokok Sena District

See also 

 Tamil primary schools in Malaysia
 Lists of Tamil national-type primary schools in Malaysia

References

Kedah
kedah